Béla Kádár (1877–1956) was a Hungarian painter influenced by Der Blaue Reiter, Cubism, Futurism, Neo-Primitivism, Constructivism, and Metaphysical painting.

Kádár was born into a working-class Jewish family. After only six years of schooling he was apprenticed as an iron-turner. He began painting murals in Budapest. He visited Paris and Berlin in 1910 and by 1918 had moved to western Europe. He had his first important exhibition in October 1923 at Herwarth Walden's Galerie Der Sturm, in Berlin, showing work in an expressionist style. During the exhibition he met Katherine Dreier, who put on two exhibitions of his work at the Brooklyn Museum of Art in New York City, the second of which, in September 1928, Kádár attended.

References
Bela Kadar & Hugo Scheiber, A Storm in Europe (Ben Uri Gallery and Museum, 2003), .

External links

1877 births
1956 deaths
20th-century Hungarian painters
Hungarian male painters
20th-century Hungarian male artists